Halobiotus is a genus of water bear or moss piglet, a tardigrade in the class Eutardigrada.

Species
 Halobiotus arcturulius Crisp and Kristensen, 1983
 Halobiotus crispae Kristensen, 1982
 Halobiotus stenostomus (Richters, 1908)

References

External links

Parachaela
Tardigrade genera
Polyextremophiles